Jonathan Lear is an American philosopher and psychoanalyst. He is the John U. Nef Distinguished Service Professor in the Committee on Social Thought and Roman Family Director of the Neubauer Collegium for Culture and Society at the University of Chicago.

Education and career
Lear was educated at Yale and Cambridge, and earned his Ph.D. in philosophy at Rockefeller University with a dissertation on Aristotle's logic directed by Saul Kripke. He also trained at the Western New England Institute for Psychoanalysis. He subsequently won the Gradiva Award from the National Association for Psychoanalysis three times for work that advances psychoanalysis.

Before moving to Chicago permanently in 1996, Lear taught philosophy at Cambridge University (1979-1985), where he was a Fellow of Clare College and Yale University (1978–79, 1985-1996).  He was previously married to the political scientist Cynthia Farrar, of the Farrar publishing dynasty, and is currently married to Gabriel Richardson Lear, a fellow member of the philosophy department at Chicago who also works on ancient philosophy.

He is a member of the International Psychoanalytical Association.  He is the nephew of Norman Lear, and the father of New Girl writer Sophia Lear.

In 2009, he received the Mellon Distinguished Achievement Award in the Humanities.  In 2017, he was elected a Fellow of the American Academy of Arts and Sciences.
He was elected a Member of the American Philosophical Society in 2019.

Philosophical work

Much of his work involves the intersection of psychoanalysis and philosophy. In addition to work involving Sigmund Freud, he has also written widely on Aristotle, Plato, Immanuel Kant, Søren Kierkegaard and Ludwig Wittgenstein, focusing on ideas of the human psyche.

His books include:
Aristotle and Logical Theory (1980)
Aristotle: The Desire to Understand (1988)
Love and Its Place in Nature (1990)
Open Minded: Working Out the Logic of the Soul (1998)
Happiness, Death, and the Remainder of Life (2000)
Therapeutic Action: An Earnest Plea for Irony (2003)
Freud (2005)
Radical Hope: Ethics in the Face of Cultural Devastation (2006)
A Case for Irony (2011)
Wisdom Won From Illness: Essays in Philosophy and Psychoanalysis (2017)
The Idea of a Philosophical Anthropology: The Spinoza Lectures (2017)
Imagining the End: Mourning and Ethical Life (2022)

See also
American philosophy
List of American philosophers

References

Sources
http://chronicle.uchicago.edu/001116/lear.shtml
http://philosophy.uchicago.edu/faculty/lear.html
https://web.archive.org/web/20050829075330/http://humanities.sas.upenn.edu/04-05/event_lear.html

External links

Jonathan Lear's lecture, "Shame and Courage at the Collapse of Civilization" at Walter Chapin Simpson Center for the Humanities in 2006
Transcript and audio of ABC Radio (Australia) interview with Jonathan Lear, January 31, 2009
"A Lost Conception of Irony", Jonathan Lear, Berfrois, 4 January 2011
"Why Mourning Is Essential to Our Well-Being with Jonathan Lear", University of Chicago,   (Ep. 108), 2 March 2023

21st-century American philosophers
American logicians
American psychoanalysts
Living people
Philosophers of psychology
University of Chicago faculty
Yale University alumni
1948 births
Members of the American Philosophical Society